Transmetal is an extreme metal band formed in Ciudad Azteca, Ecatepec, Mexico in 1987 by brothers Javier, Juan, and Lorenzo Partida. They are known as one of the most important metal bands in Latin America. Their most well known song is "Killers" from the Desear un Funeral EP (1989), which is a cover of French band .

During their career, Transmetal have released over 30 albums which experiment in thrash and death metal, with the vocals styles based on growling. The band has also participated in shows with other notable bands such as Slayer, Sepultura, Overkill, and Kreator.

Band members

Current
Juan Partida – lead guitar (1987–present)
Lorenzo Partida – bass (1987–present)
Javier Partida – drums (1987–present)
Sergio Burgos – lead vocals (2014–present)
Arturo Cabrera – rhythm guitar (2014–present)

Former 
Alberto Pimentel – lead vocals, rhythm guitar (1987–1990, 1992–1998, 2007–2009)
Alejandro González – lead vocals (1990–1992)
Mauricio Torres – lead vocals (1998–2004)
Bruno Blázquez – lead vocals (2005–2007)
Arturo Huizar – lead vocals (1998)
Glen Benton – lead vocals (1993)
Chris Menpart – lead vocals, rhythm guitar (2009–2014)
Juan Carlos Camarena – rhythm guitar (1990–1992, 2004–2005)
Ernesto Torres – rhythm guitar (1998–2003)
Antonio Tenorio – rhythm guitar (2005–2007)

Timeline

Discography
Muerto en la Cruz (1988)
Desear un Funeral (1989) (EP)
Sepelio en el Mar (1990)
Zona Muerta (1991)
Amanecer en el Mausoleo (1992)
Burial at Sea (1992)	
En Vivo Vols. 1 & 2 (1992) (live album)
Crónicas de Dolor (1993)
El Infierno de Dante (1993) (also available as Dante's Inferno)
Veloz y Devastador Metal (1994)
El Llamado de la Hembra (1996)
Las Alas del Emperador (1996)
México Bárbaro (1996)	
Debajo de los Cielos Púrpura (1999)
XIII Años en Vivo Primera Parte/XIII Años en Vivo Segunda Parte (2000) (live album)
Tristeza de Lucifer (2002)	
El Amor Supremo (2002)
Lo Podrido Corona La Inmensidad (2004)	
17 Years Down in Hell (2004)	
Temple De Acero (2004)
El Despertar de la Adversidad (2006)	
Progresión Neurótica (2006)
20 Años Ondeando La Bandera Del Metal (2007)
Odyssey In the Flesh (2008)
En Vivo Desde Tijuana (2010) (live album)
Decadencia en la Modernidad (2011)
Indestructible (2012)
Clasicos (2013)
Peregrinación a la cabeza de Cristo (2014)
Clásicos II (2015)

References

External links
Official band website

Mexican heavy metal musical groups
Mexican death metal musical groups
Mexican thrash metal musical groups
Musical groups established in 1987
Musical groups from Michoacán